Mieczysław Szczurek (13 January 1923 – 12 May 1978) was a Polish footballer. He played in five matches for the Poland national football team from 1947 to 1950.

References

External links
 

1923 births
1978 deaths
Polish footballers
Poland international footballers
Place of birth missing
Association footballers not categorized by position